Om du vill vara med mig is the fourth studio album by the Swedish singer-songwriter Melissa Horn, released October 2, 2013, on Sony/Svedala. It was produced by Ola Gustafsson.

Track listing

Charts

References

2013 albums
Melissa Horn albums